Lincoln County is a county located in the U.S. state of Montana. As of the 2020 census, the population was 19,677. Its county seat is Libby. The county was founded in 1909 and named for President Abraham Lincoln. The county lies on Montana's north border and thus shares the US-Canadian border with the Canadian province of British Columbia.

This heavily wooded and mountainous county once was part of Flathead County until residents of Libby and Eureka petitioned the state legislature for separation. Libby won an election over Eureka to host the county seat.

Geography
The county borders the Canadian province of British Columbia to the north. The lowest point in the state of Montana is located on the Kootenai River in Lincoln County, where it flows out of Montana and into Idaho. Upstream, Libby Dam backs up huge Lake Koocanusa (combination name of Kootenai, Canada, USA) into Canada's British Columbia.

Adjacent counties and county-equivalents

 Regional District of Central Kootenay, British Columbia – northwest
 Regional District of East Kootenay, British Columbia – north
 Flathead County – east
 Sanders County – south
 Bonner County, Idaho – southwest/Pacific Time Border
 Boundary County, Idaho – northwest/Pacific Time Border

National protected areas

 Pacific Northwest National Scenic Trail (part)
 Flathead National Forest (part)
 Kaniksu National Forest (part)
 Kootenai National Forest (part)

Economics

Top employers
In 2003, the top employers are listed in the table below.

Demographics

2000 census
As of the 2000 United States census, there were 18,837 people, 7,764 households, and 5,333 families living in the county. The population density was 5 people per square mile (2/km2). There were 9,319 housing units at an average density of 3 per square mile (1/km2). The racial makeup of the county was 96.09% White, 0.11% Black or African American, 1.20% Native American, 0.31% Asian, 0.04% Pacific Islander, 0.39% from other races, and 1.86% from two or more races. 1.44% of the population were Hispanic or Latino of any race. 23.6% were of German, 12.0% English, 10.2% American, 9.8% Norwegian and 9.4% Irish ancestry. 96.5% spoke English, 1.7% German and 1.3% Spanish as their first language.

There were 7,764 households, out of which 29.10% had children under the age of 18 living with them, 57.10% were married couples living together, 7.80% had a female householder with no husband present, and 31.30% were non-families. 26.70% of all households were made up of individuals, and 10.00% had someone living alone who was 65 years of age or older. The average household size was 2.40 and the average family size was 2.90.

The county population contained 25.30% under the age of 18, 5.50% from 18 to 24, 24.20% from 25 to 44, 29.70% from 45 to 64, and 15.20% who were 65 years of age or older. The median age was 42 years. For every 100 females there were 102.70 males. For every 100 females age 18 and over, there were 100.50 males.

The median income for a household in the county was $26,754, and the median income for a family was $31,784. Males had a median income of $30,299 versus $20,600 for females. The per capita income for the county was $13,923. About 14.20% of families and 19.20% of the population were below the poverty line, including 26.40% of those under age 18 and 10.80% of those age 65 or over.

2010 census
As of the 2010 United States census, there were 19,687 people, 8,843 households, and 5,608 families living in the county. The racial makeup of the county was 95.9% white, 0.9% American Indian, 0.3% Asian, 0.1% black or African American, 0.4% from other races, and 2.3% from two or more races. Those of Hispanic or Latino origin made up 2.3% of the population. In terms of ancestry, 31.5% were German, 15.7% were Irish, 15.3% were English, 10.2% were Norwegian, and 3.3% were American.

Of the 8,843 households, 23.2% had children under the age of 18 living with them, 52.0% were married couples living together, 7.4% had a female householder with no husband present, 36.6% were non-families, and 30.6% of all households were made up of individuals. The average household size was 2.20 and the average family size was 2.72. The median age was 48.9 years.

The median income for a household in the county was $30,823 and the median income for a family was $39,600. Males had a median income of $40,944 versus $24,965 for females. The per capita income for the county was $19,626. About 13.7% of families and 18.6% of the population were below the poverty line, including 28.2% of those under age 18 and 12.1% of those age 65 or over.

Communities

Cities
 Libby (county seat)
 Troy

Towns
 Eureka
 Rexford

Census-designated places

 Bull Lake
 Fortine
 Happys Inn
 Indian Springs
 Midvale (former)
 Pioneer Junction
 Stryker
 Sylvanite
 Trego
 West Kootenai
 White Haven
 Yaak

Other unincorporated communities

 Dodge Summit
 Jennings
 Kootenai Falls
 Roosville
 Tobacco
 Yarnell

Politics
For its first eighty years, Lincoln County was a Democratic-leaning area that would vote Republican only during large GOP landslides. Only four Republicans were to win the county in the seventeen Presidential elections between its inaugural election in 1912 and 1976. However, like many timber-dependent counties, it has become overwhelmingly Republican since that time. The last Democrat to carry Lincoln County was Michael Dukakis during the drought-influenced 1988 election. Since then, no Democrat has reached 35 percent of the county's vote.

See also
 List of lakes in Lincoln County, Montana
 List of mountains in Lincoln County, Montana (A-L)
 List of mountains in Lincoln County, Montana (M-Z)
 National Register of Historic Places listings in Lincoln County MT

Notes

References

External links
 Lincoln County, Montana

 
1909 establishments in Montana
Populated places established in 1909